Galeão (Portuguese meaning galleon) may refer to:

Galeão Air Force Base, a Brazilian Air Force base in Rio de Janeiro, Brazil
Rio de Janeiro–Galeão International Airport (Galeão–Antonio Carlos Jobim International Airport), an airport in the city of Rio de Janeiro, Brazil
Galeão, Rio de Janeiro, a district and beach in the neighborhood of Ilha do Governador in the city of Rio de Janeiro, Brazil
Galleon, a large, multi-decked sailing ship used primarily by European states from the 16th to 18th centuries
Baía do Galeão, a bay northeast of the island of Maio in Cape Verde